The Hogg Building, also known as the Hogg Palace, is a building located at 401 Louisiana in Downtown Houston, Texas, and is listed on the National Register of Historic Places.

History
The Hogg Building was known as the Armor Building during the design process and the Great Southern Building when it opened in March 1921. Charles Erwin Barglebaugh and Lloyd R. Whitson of El Paso designed the eight-story, Sullivan-inspired building. The ground floor was used as a showroom for automobiles, while the other stories were dedicated to office space. It was constructed of concrete with reinforced steel, thus eliminating the need for a large number of piers. The building is also characterized by a great number of windows, covering much of the outer facing. Ornamentation marks the tops of the seventh and first floors.

William Clifford Hogg, the eldest son of former Texas Governor Jim Hogg, used the eighth-floor penthouse to manage Hogg Brothers Company and the family's philanthropic projects. In the 1920s, Hogg's workspace was, "surrounded by a roof garden lavishly abloom with shrubs and flowers, in a suite of elegantly furnished rooms that included an oval dining room, a kitchen, a living room, and a guest bedroom as well as offices."  He decorated the penthouse with his collection of artwork by Frederic Remington. The Hogg family used the penthouse as a business office until 1941.

In the early 1990s, developer Randall Davis converted the retail and office building into seventy-nine loft apartments. Davis opened the refurbished building as the Hogg Palace Lofts in the fall of 1995, and it was already fully leased by the end of that year.

See also
 National Register of Historic Places listings in Harris County, Texas

References

External links

 
 
 
 
 Arthur Lefevre, Jr., "HOGG, WILLIAM CLIFFORD," Handbook of Texas Online (http://www.tshaonline.org/handbook/online/articles/fho20), accessed November 26, 2014. Uploaded on June 15, 2010. Published by the Texas State Historical Association.

1921 establishments in Texas
Buildings and structures in Houston
Mediterranean Revival architecture in the United States
National Register of Historic Places in Houston
Office buildings on the National Register of Historic Places in Texas
Recorded Texas Historic Landmarks